Michael Stanley Whittingham (born 22 December 1941) is a British-American chemist. He is currently a professor of chemistry and director of both the Institute for Materials Research and the Materials Science and Engineering program at Binghamton University, State University of New York. He also serves as director of the Northeastern Center for Chemical Energy Storage (NECCES) of the U.S. Department of Energy at Binghamton. He was awarded the Nobel Prize in Chemistry in 2019 alongside Akira Yoshino and John B. Goodenough.

Whittingham is a key figure in the history of the development of lithium-ion batteries, which now are used in everything from mobile phones to electric vehicles. He first discovered intercalation electrodes and thoroughly described the concept of intercalation reactions in rechargeable batteries in the 1970s. He holds the original patents on the concept of the use of intercalation chemistry in high power-density, highly reversible lithium-ion batteries. He also invented the first rechargeable lithium metal battery (LMB), patented in 1977, and assigned to Exxon for commercialization in small devices and electric vehicles. Whittingham's rechargeable lithium metal battery is based on a LiAl anode and an intercalation-type TiS2 cathode. His work on lithium batteries laid the foundations for others' later developments and is therefore called the founding father of lithium-ion batteries.

Education and career 
Whittingham was born in Nottingham, England, on 22 December 1941. He was educated at Stamford School from 1951 to 1960, before going up to New College, Oxford to read Chemistry. At the University of Oxford, he took his BA (1964), MA (1967), and DPhil (1968). After completing his graduate studies, Whittingham became a postdoctoral fellow at Stanford University. He then worked for Exxon Research & Engineering Company for 16 years. He then spent four years working for Schlumberger prior to becoming a professor at Binghamton University.

From 1994 to 2000, he served as the University's vice provost for research. He also served as Vice-Chair of the Research Foundation of the State University of New York for six years. He is currently a Distinguished Professor of Chemistry and Materials Science and Engineering at Binghamton University. Whittingham was named Chief Scientific Officer of NAATBatt International in 2017.

Whittingham co-chaired the DOE study of Chemical Energy Storage in 2007, and is now Director of the Northeastern Center for Chemical Energy Storage (NECCES), a U.S. Department of Energy's Energy Frontier Research Center (EFRC) at Binghamton. In 2014, NECCES was awarded $12.8 million, from the U.S. Department of Energy to help accelerate scientific breakthroughs needed to build a new 21st-century economy. In 2018, NECCES was given another $3 million by the Department of Energy to continue its important research on batteries. The NECCES team is using the funding to make energy-storage materials work better and to develop new materials that are "cheaper, environmentally friendly, and able to store more energy than current materials can".

Research 
Whittingham is a key figure in the history of the development of lithium-ion batteries, discovering the concept of intercalation electrodes. Exxon manufactured Whittingham's lithium-ion battery in the 1970s, which was based on a titanium disulfide cathode and a lithium-aluminum anode. The battery had high energy density and the diffusion of lithium ions into the titanium disulphide cathode was reversible, making the battery rechargeable. In addition, titanium disulphide has a particularly fast rate of lithium ion diffusion into the crystal lattice. Exxon threw its resources behind the commercialization of a Li/LiClO/ TiS battery. Safety concerns led Exxon to end the project. Whittingham and his team continued to publish their work in academic journals of electrochemistry and solid-state physics. He eventually left Exxon in 1984 and spent four years at Schlumberger as a Manager. In 1988, he accepted the position of Professor at the Chemistry Department, Binghamton University, U.S. to pursue his academic interests.

"All these batteries are called intercalation batteries. It’s like putting jam in a sandwich. In the chemical terms, it means you have a crystal structure, and we can put lithium ions in, take them out, and the structure’s exactly the same afterwards," Whittingham said. "We retain the crystal structure. That’s what makes these lithium batteries so good, allows them to cycle for so long."

Today's lithium batteries are limited in capacity because less than one lithium-ion/electron is reversibly intercalated per transition metal redox center. To achieve higher energy densities, one approach is to go beyond the one-electron redox intercalation reactions of the above systems. Currently, Whittingham's research has advanced to multi-electron intercalation reactions, which can increase the storage capacity by intercalating multiple lithium ions. A few multi-electron intercalation materials have been successfully developed by Whittingham, like LiVOPO4/VOPO4. The multivalent vanadium cation (V3+<->V5+) plays an important role to accomplish the multi-electron reactions. These promising materials shine lights on the battery industry to increase energy density rapidly.

He received the Young Author Award from The Electrochemical Society in 1971, the Battery Research Award in 2003, and was elected a Fellow in 2004. In 2010, he was listed as one of the Top 40 innovators for contributions to advancing green technology by Greentech Media. In 2012, Whittingham received the IBA Yeager Award for Lifetime Contribution to Lithium Battery Materials Research, and he was elected a Fellow of Materials Research Society in 2013. He was listed along with John B. Goodenough, for pioneering research leading to the development of the lithium-ion battery on a list of Clarivate Citation Laureates for the Nobel Prize in Chemistry by Thomson Reuters in 2015. In 2018, Whittingham was elected to the National Academy of Engineering, "for pioneering the application of intercalation chemistry for energy storage materials."

In 2019, Whittingham, along with John B. Goodenough and Akira Yoshino, was awarded the 2019 Nobel Prize in Chemistry "for the development of lithium-ion batteries."

Personal life

Stanley is married to Dr. Georgina Whittingham, a Professor of Spanish at the State University of New York, Oswego. He has two children, Michael Whittingham and Jenniffer Whittingham-Bras.

Recognition

 2007 Chancellor's Award for Excellence in Scholarship and Creative Activities, and Outstanding Research Award, State University of New York
 2010 Award for Lifetime Contributions from the American Chemical Society
 2015 Thomson Reuters Citation Laureate
 2017 Senior Scientist Award from the International Society for Solid State Ionics
 2018 Turnbull Award from the Materials Research Society
 2018 Member National Academy of Engineering
 2019 Nobel Prize in Chemistry with John B. Goodenough and Akira Yoshino

Books

Most-cited papers
Following is a short list of some of his most cited papers.

References

External links 

M. Stanley Whittingham's profile at Binghamton University website
 M. Stanley Whittingham's interview  at École supérieure de physique et de chimie industrielles de la ville de Paris history of science website
  including the Nobel Lecture on Sunday 8 December 2019 The Origins of the Lithium Battery

1941 births
Living people
People educated at Stamford School
Alumni of New College, Oxford
Binghamton University faculty
State University of New York faculty
Nobel laureates in Chemistry
English Nobel laureates
British emigrants to the United States
English chemists
English inventors
Schlumberger people
ExxonMobil people
Inorganic chemists
Solid state chemists